STI West Negros University, also referred to by its acronym STI WNU or colloquially as West Neg, is a private university located in Bacolod, Negros Occidental, Philippines established in 1948.

The university is accredited by the Philippine Association of Colleges and Universities - Commission On Accreditation (PACUCOA) as a level II school and awards degrees in associate, bachelor, master, and doctorate levels through its Colleges and School of Graduate Studies. It also offers complete basic education (pre-school, elementary & junior high school) through its School of Basic Education, formerly Integrated School (IS). Senior high school is being offered in the institution as well.

STI West Negros University has an enrollment of about 10,000 students per semester and produces 1,500 graduates every school year.

The acronym STI is an orphan initialism.

History

West Negros College (WNC) was founded in 1948 by three Baptist women leaders - Luciana Aritao, Teresa Padilla and Rosario Remitio after the Second World War. They believed that the school would fulfill their dream of Filipinos embracing Christian ideals and tenets. Leodegario Natividad Agustin became the school President in the 1970s; he provided the impetus, despite financial odds, to make West Negros College a successful academic community.

On February 11, 2008, the Commission on Higher Education found West Negros College to be in full compliance of their requirements and granted West Negros College  status as a university (WNU).

In April 2013, STI Education Systems Holdings, Inc. announced in a disclosure that they had signed a memorandum of agreement with West Negros University for the acquisition of a controlling interest in the school. The acquisition was done on October 31, 2013.

In 2014, the institution significantly changed its name to STI West Negros University and in 2015, the remaining sole Bacolod campus of STI College in nearby Lacson Street (initially established in 2013) and the West Negros University - Integrated School in Eroreco Subdivision transferred and merged all of its operations to the newly renovated campus in Burgos Street. The school could also be accessed through its backgate at LN Agustin Drive.

Academics 

As of 2021 to present, aside from the School of Basic Education, Senior High School, and School of Graduate Studies, STI WNU has six Colleges namely, College of Education, Arts and Sciences (CEAS), College of Criminal Justice Education (CCJE), College of Information and Communication Technology (CICT), College of Business Management and Accountancy (CBMA), College of Hospitality and Tourism Management (CHTM), and College of Engineering (COE).

Events
The school's gymnasium served as the venue for the indoor volleyball games of the 2005 Southeast Asian Games.

Notable alumni

Frank Chavez
Dingdong Dantes
Nonoy Baclao
Peter Solis Nery
Jovin Bedic
Camelo Tacusalme
Luis T. Centina Jr.

References

External links
STI WNU Official website
STI College Official website

Universities and colleges in Bacolod
Educational institutions established in 1948
Protestant schools in the Philippines
1948 establishments in the Philippines